Carlo Manfredi may refer to:

Carlo I Manfredi (1406–1410), brother of Guidantonio Manfredi, lord of Faenza
Carlo II Manfredi (1439–1484), lord of Faenza